Deschampsia flexuosa, commonly known as wavy hair-grass, is a species of bunchgrass in the grass family widely distributed in Eurasia, Africa, South America, and North America.

Description
Wavy hair-grass, Deschampsia flexuosa, has wiry leaves and delicate, shaking panicles formed of silvery or purplish-brown flower heads on wavy, hair-like stalks. 
The leaves are bunched in tight tufts with plants forming a very tussocky, low sward 5 to 20 cm tall before flowering, to 30 cm high.

Distribution and habitat
Deschampsia flexuosa is found naturally in dry grasslands and on moors and heaths.

It is also an important component of the ground flora of birch and oak woodland.
 
The plant has a preference for acidic, free-draining soil, and avoids chalk and limestone areas.

See also
Woodland and scrub communities in the British National Vegetation Classification system—birch and oak woodland

References

External links

Sky flora: Deschampsia flexuosa

flexuosa
Bunchgrasses of Europe
Bunchgrasses of North America
Bunchgrasses of South America
Bunchgrasses of Africa
Butterfly food plants